The 2016 NASCAR Whelen Southern Modified Tour was the fourteenth and final season of the NASCAR Whelen Southern Modified Tour (WSMT). It began at Caraway Speedway on March 12 and concluded at Charlotte Motor Speedway on October 6. Andy Seuss entered the season as the defending Drivers' Champion. Burt Myers won the championship, 20 points in front of George Brunnhoelzl III.

The 2016 season was the final season before NASCAR merged the two modified tours for 2017.

Drivers

Notes

Schedule
Four of the eleven races in the 2016 season were televised on NBCSN and were on a tape delay basis.

Notes

Results and standings

Races

Drivers' championship

(key) Bold – Pole position awarded by time. Italics – Pole position set by final practice results or Owner's points. * – Most laps led.

Notes
1 – Jeremy Gerstner and Gary Putnam received championship points, despite the fact that they did not start the race.
2 – Kyle Ebersole and Austin Pickens received championship points, despite the fact that they did not qualify for the race.
3 – Scored points towards the Whelen Modified Tour.

See also

2016 NASCAR Sprint Cup Series
2016 NASCAR Xfinity Series
2016 NASCAR Camping World Truck Series
2016 NASCAR K&N Pro Series East
2016 NASCAR K&N Pro Series West
2016 NASCAR Whelen Modified Tour
2016 NASCAR Pinty's Series
2016 NASCAR Whelen Euro Series

References